Alan John Farthing, FRCOG, (born 8 June 1963) is an English obstetrician and gynaecologist and Surgeon-Gynaecologist to Queen Elizabeth II's Royal Household.

Career
Farthing was born in Winchester, Hampshire.
He attended Beacon School in Crowborough, East Sussex, where his father was headmaster.
After training at St George's Hospital Medical School, London, Farthing qualified as a doctor in 1986. He became a member of the Royal College of Obstetricians and Gynaecologists in 1991, and a Fellow in 2003.

Farthing was appointed as a consultant gynaecologist at St Mary's Hospital in 1997, where he also became an honorary Senior Lecturer at Imperial College, London. He is a specialist in gynaecological cancer care, and an internationally recognised expert in the use of laparoscopic and hysteroscopic surgery.

Farthing has a private Harley Street practice, and works as a consultant at two teaching hospitals in London: Queen Charlotte's Hospital in Shepherd's Bush, and St Mary's Hospital in Paddington.

Surgeon-Gynaecologist to the Royal Household
In 2008, Farthing was appointed to assist Marcus Setchell, who was retiring from the NHS, as the Queen's Surgeon-Gynaecologist.

Personal life
Farthing was separated from his first wife when he met BBC TV presenter Jill Dando. After Farthing's divorce in late 1998, the couple announced their engagement on 31 January 1999 and were due to marry in September 1999.

On 26 April 1999, Dando was murdered on the doorstep of her house in Gowan Avenue, Fulham. Farthing rarely speaks about Dando's murder, with his last major interview given to the Daily Mail in June 1999. In the interview, Farthing said that Dando had made him breakfast at his then home in Chiswick, West London before he left for work. Dando then went shopping before returning to her home in Gowan Avenue, where she was shot and killed. Farthing described how a week after Dando's murder, he found a reporters' notebook containing a draft of the speech she had intended to give on their wedding day. Dando's co-presenter on Crimewatch, Nick Ross, proposed the formation of an academic institute in her name and together with Farthing raised almost £1.5 million. The Jill Dando Institute of Crime Science was founded at University College London on 26 April 2001, the second anniversary of her murder.

References

External links
Bio at Imperial College, London

1963 births
Living people
English gynaecologists
Academics of Imperial College London
English obstetricians
People from Winchester
Alumni of St George's, University of London
Fellows of the Royal College of Obstetricians and Gynaecologists
20th-century English medical doctors
21st-century English medical doctors
Medical doctors from Hampshire